Where Are You Going, DdaengChul? ( was a variety show that was launched by TV Chosun.

Host 
The three hosts collectively called "Three 철 (Chul)", which was named after the name "철" in each person's name.

Format 
A new travel variety show starring Super Junior's Kim Hee-chul and comedians Kim Young-chul and Noh Hong-chul. The three "Chul" brothers will be staying at guest houses in Korea and seeing all the local attractions, food, and scenery the destinations have to offer.

Contents of each episode

References

South Korean variety television shows
Korean-language television shows
2018 South Korean television series debuts